The 1913 All-Ireland Senior Hurling Championship Final was the 26th All-Ireland Final and the culmination of the 1913 All-Ireland Senior Hurling Championship, an inter-county hurling tournament for the top teams in Ireland. The match was held at Croke Park, Dublin, on 2 November 1913, between Kilkenny, represented by a club side from Mooncoin, and Tipperary, represented by club side Toomevara. The Munster champions lost to their Leinster opponents on a score line of 2–4 to 1–2.

Match

Summary
J. Murphy opened the scoring with a goal for Tipperary and Matt Gargan replied with a Kilkenny goal. Kilkenny's vital second goal was scored by Sim Walton.

It was Kilkenny's third All-Ireland title in-a-row and a remarkable seventh All-Ireland title in ten championship seasons. It was also the first all-Ireland final in which teams of 15 took part.

A matchday programme from the game sold at auction in Kilkenny for more than €2,000 in 2018.

Details

References

1
All-Ireland Senior Hurling Championship Finals
Kilkenny GAA matches
Tipperary GAA matches
All-Ireland Senior Hurling Championship Final
All-Ireland Senior Hurling Championship Final, 1913